The USMLE-Step 2-CK ("Clinical Knowledge") is the nine-hour-long multiple-choice portion of the second part of the United States Medical Licensure Examination. It assesses clinical knowledge through a traditional, multiple-choice examination. In contrast to the USMLE Step 1, the focus is much more on clinical application of medical knowledge. It assesses the ability to apply medical knowledge, skills, and understanding of clinical science essential for the provision of patient care under supervision. The USMLE Step 2 is generally taken during the 4th year of medical school by U.S. medical students.

Format 
The exam is administered in a 9-hour single-day computer-based session. The session is divided into eight one-hour blocks of questions, a 15 minute tutorial and a 45 minute break. The 15-minute tutorial at the beginning of the exam is optional. The 45 minutes allowed for breaks can only be taken between sections at the discretion of the test taker. Both the unused tutorial time and time saved from finishing a test block early is added to the break time. The test is administered at the Prometric testing sites.

Topics
Step 2 CK includes test items in the following content areas: internal medicine, obstetrics and gynecology, pediatrics, preventive medicine, psychiatry, surgery, other areas relevant to provision of care under supervision.

Most Step 2 CK test items describe clinical situations and require that you provide one or more of the following: diagnosis, a prognosis, an indication of underlying mechanisms of disease, the next step in medical care, including preventive measures.

Step 2 CK is an integrated examination that frequently requires the interpretation of tables and laboratory data, imaging studies, photographs of gross and microscopic pathologic specimens, and results of other diagnostic studies. Step 2 CK tests the aspiring physician's knowledge of medicine putting special emphasis on the principles and mechanisms underlying disease, and the therapies needed to address them.

Scoring 
The Step 2CK scores are reported in a 3 digit format with a range between 1 and 300. As of 2022, the passing score is 209. 

As of academic year 2020-2021, the mean CK score was 246 with a standard deviation of 15 for first-time takers from accredited medical schools in the United States and Canada. 

Approximately once every four years, the USMLE decides whether to change the recommended minimum passing score. At its May 2014 meeting, the Step 2 Committee conducted a review for USMLE Step 2 Clinical Knowledge (CK) and decided to raise the Step 2 minimum passing score to 209 for students taking the test after July 1, 2014. In 2022, the passing score was increased to 214, with an implementation date of July 1 2022. 

USMLE provides each test taker with a score report that includes information on their performance on various physician tasks, disciplines and systems.

Effect on Residency Matching
The USMLE Step 2 CK score is one of many factors considered by residency programs in selecting applicants. Along with the USMLE Step 1, this test is a standardized measure of all applicants. The median USMLE Step 2 scores for graduates of U.S. Medical Schools for various residencies is published periodically by the NRMP in their "Charting Outcomes in the Match" documents

USMLE Step 1’s pass/fail status in 2022 is likely to enhance the effect of USMLE Step 2 CK on residency matching, since it will remain as the sole standardized factor in the residency application process.

See also 
USMLE Step 1
USMLE Step 2 Clinical Skills
USMLE Step 3

References

External links

Medical education in the United States
Standardized tests in healthcare education
United States Medical Licensing Examination